The Barry Inglis Medal  is awarded by the National Measurement Institute, Australia for leadership, research and/or applications of measurement techniques. It is named in honour of Barry Inglis, inaugural CEO and Chief Metrologist of Australia’s National Measurement Institute (NMI) which was set up in 2004.  The inaugural medal was in 2008.

Recipients 

 2008 John E. Sader, University of Melbourne
 2009 Michael E. Tobar, University of Western Australia
 2010 Kenneth Baldwin, ANU
 2011 Philip N. H. Nakashima, Monash University
 2012 Not awarded
 2013 Not awarded
 2014 Bruce Forgan, Bureau of Meteorology
 2015  Graham Jones, St Vincent's Hospital
 2016 Infrared Soil Analysis Group and Ziltek Pty Ltd, led by Mike McLaughlin, CSIRO
 2017 Andre Luiten, University of Adelaide
 2018 Derek Abbott, University of Adelaide
 2019 Wojciech Chrzanowski , University of Sydney
 2020 Warwick Bowen, University of Queensland
2021 Joseph Berry, University of Melbourne
2022 Oliver Jones, RMIT

See also
 List of engineering awards
 List of physics awards
 List of awards named after people

References

Australian science and technology awards
Engineering awards
Awards established in 2008